The Last Record Album is the fifth studio album by the American rock band Little Feat, released in 1975.

Background 
The album title and cover illustration by Neon Park both allude to the 1971 film The Last Picture Show as well as the title typography on the film's poster, with Hollywood Boulevard turned into a desert leading to the apparent visual pun of the Hollywood sign Jell-O mold "dessert" (at left, Frederick's of Hollywood has long since closed, but the famous Grauman's Chinese Theatre at right is still a landmark).

The album's back cover includes the record's lyrics. One song, "Hi Roller," was marked out in black ink with the annotation "Maybe Next Time". The song was indeed included on their next album Time Loves a Hero.

Reception 
Reviewing the album for AllMusic, Stephen Thomas Erlewine wrote, "For a very short album -- only eight songs -- too many of the cuts fall flat. Those that succeed, however, are quite good, particularly Paul Barrère and Bill Payne's gently propulsive 'All That You Dream,' Lowell George's beautiful 'Long Distance Love,' and the sublime 'Mercenary Territory' .... There are enough signs of Little Feat's true character on The Last Record Album -- the three previously mentioned songs are essential for any Feat fan -- to make it fairly enjoyable, but it's clear that the band is beginning to run out of steam."

The track "Long Distance Love" was placed at number 26 in John Peel's 1976 "Festive Fifty". The album was voted number 555 in the third edition of Colin Larkin's All Time Top 1000 Albums (2000).

Writing for The Guardian in 2010, after the death of Richie Hayward, Adam Sweeting commented:

Track listing

Side one
"Romance Dance" (Barrère, Gradney, Payne) – 3:49 (lead vocals: Bill Payne, Paul Barrère)
"All That You Dream" (Barrère, Payne) – 3:52 (lead vocal: Lowell George)
"Long Distance Love" (George) – 2:43 (lead vocal: Lowell George)
"Day or Night" (Payne, Fran Tate) – 6:24 (lead vocals: Bill Payne, Paul Barrère)

Side two
"One Love Stand" (Barrère, Gradney, Payne) – 4:26 (lead vocal: Lowell George)
"Down Below the Borderline" (George) – 3:41 (lead vocal: Lowell George)
"Somebody's Leavin'" (Payne) – 5:07 (vocal: Bill Payne)
"Mercenary Territory" (George, Hayward, Elizabeth George) – 4:27 (lead vocal: Lowell George)

Charts

Personnel

Musicians
Paul Barrère - guitar, vocals
Sam Clayton - congas
Lowell George - vocals, guitar
Kenny Gradney - bass
Richard Hayward - drums, vocals
Bill Payne - keyboards, synthesizer, vocals
John Hall - guitar ("All That You Dream")
Valerie Carter - backing vocals ("Long Distance Love" and "One Love Stand")
Fran Tate - backing vocals ("Long Distance Love" and "One Love Stand")

Production
Lowell George - producer
George Massenburg - engineer
Neon Park - cover artwork

References

1975 albums
Little Feat albums
Warner Records albums
Albums produced by Lowell George
Albums with cover art by Neon Park